Timur Arkadyevich Gaidar (December 8, 1926 – December 23, 1999) was a Soviet/Russian rear admiral, writer and journalist. He was supposed to be the prototype for Timur from Arkady Gaidar's book Timur and His Squad that was the inspiration for the Timurite movement.

Early life and career
Gaidar was born in Arkhangelsk, the son of well-known children's writer Arkady Gaidar and screenwriter Lia Solomyanskaya. He graduated from the Leningrad Naval School in 1948 and the faculty of journalism of the Lenin Military-Political Academy in 1954, and served on submarines of the Baltic Fleet and the Pacific Ocean Fleet. Beginning in 1957 he worked for newspapers, including The Soviet Fleet, the Red Star, and Pravda. He fought in the Bay of Pigs Invasion and was a friend of Cuban General Raúl Castro. In 1965–1971 Timur Gaidar was working in Belgrade, SFRY.

Gaidar died in Moscow. His widow is Ariadna Bazhova (born 1925), daughter of the Russian writer Pavel Bazhov. Yegor Gaidar, a Russian politician, was their son.

Notes

References 

1926 births
1999 deaths
Russian admirals
Russian Jews
Russian writers
Soviet admirals
Soviet journalists
Russian male journalists
Soviet Navy personnel
People from Arkhangelsk
Lenin Military Political Academy alumni
Submariners
20th-century Russian journalists